Te Mānihera Te Rangi-taka-i-waho (1800-1885) was a notable New Zealand tribal leader, farmer and land assessor. Of Māori descent, he identified with the Ngāti Kahungunu iwi. He was born at Pāpāwai near present-day Greytown in the Wairarapa, New Zealand.

References

1885 deaths
Ngāti Kahungunu people
New Zealand Māori farmers
1800 births